McBride may refer to:
 McBride (surname), the Irish surname held by many notable individuals

Places
 Sebree, Kentucky, United States, originally known as McBride
 McBride, Michigan, United States
 McBride, Mississippi, United States
 McBride, Missouri, United States
 McBride, Oklahoma, United States
 McBride, British Columbia, Canada
 McBride Branch, a stream in Indiana, United States
 McBride Range, a mountain range in British Columbia, Canada

Media
 McBride (film series), a 2005 series starring John Larroquette
 McBride's Magazine  related to Lippincott's Monthly Magazine and Scribner's Magazine
 Amelia McBride, lead character of the American comic book series Amelia Rules!

Other
 McBride & the Ride, a former country music band from Nashville
 McBride plc, British manufacturer of personal care products
 McBride Secondary School, a high school in British Columbia
 Don McBride Stadium, a baseball ballpark in Richmond, Indiana
 No Man's Land (Eric Bogle song), also known as "Willie McBride"

See also
 McBryde (disambiguation)
 MacBride (disambiguation)
 MacBryde